Petscop is a YouTube horror web series by Tony Domenico, made to resemble a YouTube Let's Play series. The videos follow "Paul", the protagonist, exploring and documenting a supposedly 'long-lost PlayStation video game', titled Petscop. The 24-episode series ran from March 12, 2017, to September 2, 2019. The series received widespread coverage for its storytelling, authenticity, surrealism, and its active community of viewers.

Plot summary 
The main character, Paul, has found or received a copy of the titular unreleased game Petscop supposedly developed by the fictional company Garalina, uploading recordings of its early levels. Initially, the game seems like a standard PlayStation puzzle game, centering around the player character—named "Guardian"—capturing strange creatures known as "pets" by solving puzzles. Paul remarks on the unfinished nature of the game and its lack of playable content. The first four episodes are recorded by Paul for a specific, unnamed, person. Later, Paul acknowledges that his recordings have found an audience on YouTube, though he still narrates directly to the unseen character, and occasionally speaks to them on the phone.

The game box, however, came attached with a note containing a code and instructions. By following these, Paul is able to access a dark, hidden section of the game. The new area, known as the "Newmaker Plane", is a vast grassy field, pitch dark except for a spotlight following the Guardian. The field has few landmarks, and a large network of underground tunnels. The area still loosely follows conventions of puzzle games, and Paul attempts to reverse engineer the puzzles (and the internal logic of the game) to continue progressing. As Paul finds more content, it is slowly revealed—through references to 'real-world' events and characters—that Petscop was designed for a specific person who did something horrible.

The series' overarching plot involves a man named Marvin, the disappearance of his childhood friend Lina, and an incident in which Marvin kidnaps his own daughter, Care, who he believes to be Lina reborn. There is a recurring focus on "rebirthing", a failed attempt to rebirth a girl named Belle into a girl named Tiara, and a growing connection between Paul, his family's past, and the game. It is later implied that some footage is not from Paul's perspective, introducing new viewpoints from Belle and Marvin, who are all playing Petscop simultaneously. Marvin solicits Paul's help to find landmarks on the Newmaker Plane, and re-enact the process of rebirthing his daughter, Care. Later, Paul realizes that the landmarks on the Newmaker Plane may have significance to real-life locations; after presumably traveling to one of the real landmarks, Paul is not heard from again, though his videos continue to be uploaded without narration.

Characters

Inside the game 
 Guardian or Newmaker – The player character that Paul controls. It is a green animal-like creature of an unknown species.
 Tool – A large red object that the player can ask questions to, though it usually responds with "I don't know". It is found under the Newmaker Plane.
 Marvin – Marvin exists as a character in the game, and as a person mentioned in real life. Presumably, the real Marvin is playing the game as his avatar. Paul identifies him as the strange, green-faced creature in "Petscop 8". He is the father of Care, and kidnapped her in 1997 to perform rebirthing. Marvin appears occasionally to assist Paul, and they learn to communicate in an esoteric PlayStation controller language. In certain recordings, Marvin is seen playing sections of the game which specifically address him, implying the game was made for Marvin to find. Marvin later turns on Paul, and somehow hurts him physically in "Petscop 15".
 Carrie Mark (Care) – Care is depicted in the game and is mentioned to have existed in real life. She was abducted for a period in 1997 before returning—what happened in the interim is unknown, as is what happened afterwards. In the game, she is considered a "pet" and is caught under the Newmaker Plane. She exists in three different states: A (before her kidnapping), B (during her captivity) and NLM ("Nobody Loves Me", after escaping). A fourth state exists, depicted as a literal Easter egg, after her failed "rebirthing" attempt. She is depicted only as a static item.
 Michael Hammond (Mike) – A 7-year-old boy who lived from 1988 to 1995. His tombstone is found by Paul in the game, and he is later implied to be Rainer's brother, making him the cousin of Care. The circumstances of his death are unknown, but it is implied that Petscop was originally created to be his birthday gift.
 Lina Leskowitz – Carrie's aunt, who went missing as a girl in 1977—along with an entire windmill, which vanished behind her. Marvin saw this happen, and later believed that Lina was "reborn" into his daughter, Care. Lina is thanked for "making (the game) possible" and is referred to as "boss"; the series ends with Paul and Belle walking into her. It is repeatedly said that "not everyone" can see her.

Pets 
 Randice – A flower who exists in a symbiotic relationship with Wavey.
 Toneth – A pet shown in a painting alongside Randice. Only found on the Newmaker Plane, he is a bird who has apparently broken his leg in a car accident.
 Wavey – A cloud who waters Randice to keep him alive.
 Amber – A large sentient ball who enjoys staying in her cage.
 Pen – An aspiring mathematician who spends her time in the music room, despite being deaf.
 Roneth – Toneth's baby half-brother. The method of catching him is retroactively revealed in the Newmaker Plane, in a series of puzzles that mimic the Pets.

Outside of the game 
 Paul – Identified as such only due to naming his save file, Paul is quiet and investigative. Nothing is definitively known about his connection to the family, other than his recognition of some events, and his desire to uncover the secrets of the game. There are several parallels between him and Care—he mentions that they look alike and share the same birthday—implying a surrealistic connection between the two. As Care never appears in the story, it is speculated that they are somehow the same person. Near the end of the series, there are several references to Paul being under some form of surveillance or being in captivity.
 Belle (also known as Tiara Leskowitz) – Throughout the series, Paul addresses a specific person, even in its first line: "This is just to prove to you that I'm not lying about this game I found." In "Petscop 22", Paul refers to this person as "Belle". A person named Tiara, first mentioned by the Tool and in a note in "Petscop 5", is depicted as an in-game character. Later in the series, the character insists her real name is Belle. In the series epilogue, Belle asks Paul if he remembers being "born"; when they were "smuggled away" by Lina, implying a family relationship.
 Rainer – Presumably a nickname for Care's cousin, Daniel Hammond. Rainer is or was the lead developer of Petscop, and his motives for creating the game are unclear. Some elements of the game are intended for Marvin to see, and to uncover the mystery of where he took Care. Rainer had somehow been in contact with Paul in his childhood and may have been the person to give him Petscop.
 Anna – The wife of Marvin and mother of Care.
 Jill – The owner of the channel and Care's aunt, apparently a suspicious figure according to Paul.

Reception 
Petscop has received coverage from many news sources, such as The New Yorker and Kotaku: Kotakus Patricia Hernandez wrote "if this is an internet story / game, then I am in awe of how elaborate it is", and for The New Yorkers Alex Barron, it is "the king of creepypasta". The series' popularity was largely cultivated by its coverage by several popular YouTubers, such as Pyrocynical and The Game Theorists. The Petscop YouTube channel, as of August 2022, has over 380,000 subscribers.

Interpretations and cultural links 
Petscop, as a video game, is fictional, although this was obscured for the entire run of the series. Some viewers were initially unsure as to whether "Paul" and Petscop were real, until further into the series when it became more surrealistic. Petscop was not officially identified as fiction until after the finale, when creator Tony Domenico—who had remained anonymous for the series' 30-month run—revealed himself on Twitter. In his only interview, Domenico admitted that, while the story had a concrete plot, he chose to omit most of it, sometimes scrapping footage that was already done. "I hoped to get across a feeling like there's... something strange and complex happening in the background, and you just aren't getting a full view of it." In the darker sections of the game, there are many references to child abuse, childhood trauma, and irreparable corruption, making those recurring motifs throughout the series. In addition to these themes, Domenico has cited the Marble Hornets and Ben Drowned web series as influences, involving the audience by hiding things in each video. He also named the 2006 David Lynch experimental film Inland Empire as the strongest influence for the series and noted that "too much is lost in that translation into words".

The series' initial episodes also include allusions to Candace Newmaker and her death in rebirthing therapy. Throughout the series, the word "Newmaker" appears several times; the name of the central location, and as a title given to Rainer, the Guardian character, and/or Paul himself. In addition, there is an area known as the "Quitter's Room", the repeated question "Do you remember being born?", and a character named Tiara. Domenico has stated that while the references were intentional, he later regretted them. Other references include a quote from the book Daisy-Head Mayzie by Dr. Seuss, and the imagery of the character Care crying underneath a large flower, which at first appears to be growing from her head.

Notes

References

External links 
 Official website
 Tony Domenico's Twitter
 

Fictional video games
2010s YouTube series
YouTube channels launched in 2017
Horror fiction web series
Gaming-related YouTube channels
2017 web series debuts
2019 web series endings
Child abuse in fiction
Creepypasta